Simpson Bainbridge (3 April 1895 – 12 November 1988) was an English professional footballer who played as an outside forward in the Football League for Leeds City, Preston North End and South Shields.

Personal life 
Bainbridge served as a private in the Lincolnshire Regiment, the Durham Light Infantry and the Labour Corps during the First World War. He had attested in the army on 9 December 1915 and was discharged due to a knee injury on 21 January 1919.

Career statistics

References

1895 births
Military personnel from Newcastle upon Tyne
Footballers from Sunderland
English footballers
Association football outside forwards
English Football League players
British Army personnel of World War I
1988 deaths
Royal Lincolnshire Regiment soldiers
Durham Light Infantry soldiers
Royal Pioneer Corps soldiers
South Shields F.C. (1889) players
Leeds City F.C. players
Preston North End F.C. players
Aberdeen F.C. players
Scottish Football League players
Shildon A.F.C. players
England youth international footballers